Zalog pri Moravčah is a settlement immediately east of Moravče in central Slovenia. The area is part of the traditional region of Upper Carniola. It is now included with the rest of the municipality in the Central Slovenia Statistical Region. It includes the hamlets of Planina, Učak, and Vahtenberk.

References

External links

Zalog pri Moravčah on Geopedia

Populated places in the Municipality of Moravče